Devante Dubose (born August 5, 1992) is a former American soccer player who last played for the Richmond Kickers in USL League One.

On February 19, 2019, Dubose became the first player ever signed by Oakland Roots SC.

Dubose signed with the Richmond Kickers of USL League One on 6 December 2019.

References

External links

Virginia Tech bio

1992 births
Living people
American soccer players
Association football defenders
FC Tucson players
Midland-Odessa Sockers FC players
OKC Energy FC players
Phoenix Rising FC players
San Jose Earthquakes draft picks
San Jose Earthquakes U23 players
Soccer players from California
Sportspeople from Oakland, California
USL League Two players
USL Championship players
National Independent Soccer Association players
Virginia Tech Hokies men's soccer players
Richmond Kickers players
Oakland Roots SC players